Throughout India, there are a large amount of temples dedicated to Shiva, one of the principal deities of Hinduism. The most temples are in the South Indian state of Tamil Nadu, where there are 2,500 Shiva temples of importance. There are several kinds of temples in the South Indian state of Tamil Nadu.

Pancha Bootha Sthalangal temples 

Pancha Booth Sthalangal are the temples that are the manifestation of the five elements – land, water, air, sky, and fire.

Pancha Sabhai Sthalangal 

Panch Sabhai Sthalangal are the temples where Lord Shiva is believed to have performed the Cosmic Dance.

Paadal Petra Sthalangal temples 

Shiva Temples which are glorified in Tamil Tevaram hymns are the Paadal Petra Sthalangal and have been in existence for more than 1,000 years. References to these temples are found in Tevaram Hymns, composed and authored by the 3 Nayanamars, Thirunavukarasar, Sambandar and Sundarar, who lived between 7th and 9th century CE.

Chennai & Tiruvallur

Coimbatore

Kancheepuram

Panrutti

Tindivanam

Thirukkoviloor

Ulundurpettai

Viruthachalam

Cuddalore 
Manikkam meena

Chidambaram

Kattumannarkoil

Sirkazhi

Kumbakonam

Papanasam

Kaaraikkal

Mannargudi

Thiruthuraipoondi

Nagapattinam

Namakkal

Thanjavur

Tiruchirapalli

Madurai

Dindigul 
There are several ancient Shiva temples in and around Dindigul:

Tirunelveli 
There are several ancient Shiva temples in and around Tirunelveli:

Thoothukudi - Tuticorin 
Ancient Shiva temples in and around Thoothukudi.

Tiruvannamalai

Rameswaram

Ramanathapuram

Tamilakam temples

Malai Nadu (Kerala)

Tuluva Nadu (Karnataka)

Eezha Nadu (Sri Lanka)

Sri Kalahasti Temple (Andhra Pradesh)
| 
| Kalahasteeswarar Temple
| Kalahasthi
|-

Nava Kailasam temples 

These nine Siva temples are located on the river bed of Thamirabarani river near Tirunelveli.
Papanasam
Cheran Mahadevi 
Kodaganallur
Kunnathur (Tamil Nadu), Tirunelveli
Murappanadu
Srivaikuntam
Thenthiruperai
Rajapathy
Senthamangalam, Tuticorin

References

Notes

External links
 Temples in Tamilnadu – An introduction

 
Lists of Hindu temples in India
Lists of tourist attractions in Tamil Nadu